Cleopatra is a 1963 American epic historical drama film directed by Joseph L. Mankiewicz, with a screenplay adapted by Mankiewicz, Ranald MacDougall and Sidney Buchman from the 1957 book The Life and Times of Cleopatra by Carlo Maria Franzero, and from histories by Plutarch, Suetonius, and Appian. The film stars Elizabeth Taylor in the eponymous role. Richard Burton, Rex Harrison, Roddy McDowall, and Martin Landau are featured in supporting roles. It chronicles the struggles of Cleopatra, the young queen of Egypt, to resist the imperial ambitions of Rome.

Walter Wanger had long contemplated producing a biographical film about Cleopatra. In 1958, his production company partnered with Twentieth Century Fox to produce the film. Following an extensive casting search, Elizabeth Taylor signed on to portray the title role for a record-setting salary of $1 million. Rouben Mamoulian was hired as director, and the script underwent numerous revisions from Nigel Balchin, Dale Wasserman, Lawrence Durrell, and Nunnally Johnson. Principal photography began at Pinewood Studios on September 28, 1960, but Taylor's health problems delayed further filming. Production was suspended in November after it had gone overbudget with only ten minutes of usable footage.

Mamoulian resigned as director, and was subsequently replaced by Joseph L. Mankiewicz, who had previously directed Taylor in Suddenly, Last Summer (1959). Production was re-located to Cinecittà, where filming resumed on September 25, 1961, without a finished shooting script. During filming, a personal scandal made worldwide headlines when it was reported that co-stars Taylor and Richard Burton had an adulterous affair. Filming wrapped on July 28, 1962, and further reshoots were made from February to March 1963. With the estimated production costs totaling $31 million, the film became the most expensive film ever made up to that point and nearly bankrupted the studio.

Cleopatra premiered at the Rivoli Theatre in New York City on June 12, 1963. It received a generally favorable response from film critics, and became the highest-grossing film of 1963, earning box-office receipts of $57.7 million in the United States and Canada, and one of the highest-grossing films of the decade at a worldwide level. However, the film initially lost money because of its production and marketing costs of $44 million. It received nine nominations at the 36th Academy Awards, including for Best Picture, and won four: Best Art Direction (Color), Best Cinematography (Color), Best Visual Effects and Best Costume Design (Color).

Plot
After the Battle of Pharsalus in 48 BC, Julius Caesar goes to Egypt, under the pretext of being named the executor of the will of the father of the young Pharaoh Ptolemy XIII and his sister Cleopatra.  Ptolemy and Cleopatra are in the midst of a civil war of their own and she has been driven out of the city of Alexandria.  Ptolemy rules alone under the care of his three "guardians",  the chief eunuch Pothinus, his tutor Theodotus and General Achillas.

Cleopatra convinces Caesar to restore her throne from her younger brother. Caesar, in effective control of the kingdom, sentences Pothinus to death for arranging an assassination attempt on Cleopatra, and banishes Ptolemy to the eastern desert, where he and his outnumbered army would face certain death against Mithridates. Cleopatra is crowned queen of Egypt and begins to develop megalomaniacal dreams of ruling the world with Caesar, who in turn desires to become king of Rome. They marry, and when their son Caesarion is born, Caesar accepts him publicly, which becomes the talk of Rome and the Senate.

After he is made dictator for life, Caesar sends for Cleopatra. She arrives in Rome in a lavish procession and wins the adulation of the Roman people. The Senate grows increasingly discontented amid rumors that Caesar wishes to be made king, which is anathema to the Romans. On the Ides of March in 44 BC, a group of conspirators assassinate Caesar and flee the city, starting a rebellion. An alliance among Octavian (Caesar's adopted son), Mark Antony (Caesar's right-hand man and general) and Marcus Ameilius Lepidus puts down the rebellion and splits the republic. Cleopatra is angered after Caesar's will recognizes Octavian, rather than Caesarion, as his official heir, and she returns to Egypt.

While planning a campaign against Parthia in the east, Antony realizes that he needs money and supplies that only Egypt can sufficiently provide. After refusing several times to leave Egypt, Cleopatra acquiesces and meets him on her royal barge in Tarsus. The two begin a love affair, and Cleopatra assures Antony that he is much more than a pale reflection of Caesar. Octavian's removal of Lepidus forces Antony to return to Rome, where he marries Octavian's sister Octavia to prevent political conflict. This upsets and enrages Cleopatra. Antony and Cleopatra reconcile and marry, with Antony divorcing Octavia. Octavian, incensed, reads Antony's will to the Roman senate, revealing that Antony wishes to be buried in Egypt. Rome turns against Antony, and Octavian's call for war against Egypt receives a rapturous response. The war is decided at the naval Battle of Actium on September 2, 31 BC, where Octavian's fleet, under the command of Agrippa, defeats the lead ships of the Antony-Egyptian fleet. Cleopatra assumes that Antony is dead and orders the Egyptian forces home. Antony follows her, leaving the rest of his fleet leaderless and soon defeated.

Several months later, Cleopatra sends Cesarion under disguise out of Alexandria. She manages to convince Antony to resume command of his troops and fight Octavian's advancing army. However, Antony's soldiers abandon him during the night. Rufio, the last man loyal to Antony, kills himself. Antony tries to goad Octavian into single combat, but is finally forced to flee into the city. When Antony returns to the palace, Apollodorus, in love with Cleopatra himself, tells him she is in her tomb as she had instructed, and lets Antony believe she is dead. Antony falls on his own sword. Apollodorus then confesses that he misled Antony and assists him to the tomb where Cleopatra and two servants have taken refuge. Antony dies in Cleopatra's arms.

Octavian and his army march into Alexandria with Caesarion's dead body in a wagon. He discovers the dead body of Apollodorus, who had poisoned himself. Octavian receives word that Antony is dead and that Cleopatra is holed up in a tomb. There he offers to allow her to rule Egypt as a Roman province if she will accompany him to Rome. Cleopatra, knowing that her son is dead, agrees to Octavian's terms, including an empty pledge on the life of her son not to harm herself. After Octavian departs, she orders her servants in coded language to assist with her suicide. Octavian discovers that she is going to kill herself and he and his guards burst into Cleopatra's chamber to find her dead, dressed in gold, along with her servants and the asp that killed her.

Cast

Production
Walter Wanger had long desired to produce a biographical film about Cleopatra. As an undergraduate at Dartmouth College, he first read Théophile Gautier's fantasy novel One of Cleopatra's Nights and Other Fantastic Romances and then Thomas North's 1579 English translation of Plutarch's Lives and William Shakespeare's Antony and Cleopatra. Wanger had envisioned Cleopatra as "the quintessence of youthful femininity, of womanliness and strength," but it was not until he watched Elizabeth Taylor in A Place in the Sun (1951) that he found his ideal candidate for the role. Around this time, Wanger had discovered through a private detective that his wife Joan Bennett was having an extramarital affair with her talent agent Jennings Lang. On the afternoon of December 13, 1951, Wanger shot Lang twice after having spotted him with Bennett in a parking lot near MCA. Lang survived, and Wanger, pleading insanity, served four months in prison at the Castaic Honor Farm, north of Los Angeles.

Following his release, Wanger had achieved a career comeback, having produced Invasion of the Body Snatchers (1956) and I Want to Live! (1958), in which Susan Hayward won the Academy Award for Best Actress. He would soon return to his dream project of a Cleopatra biographical film.

Development
Wanger pitched the idea to various film studios, including Monogram and RKO Pictures. He also approached Taylor and her husband Michael Todd about producing the project with United Artists. Taylor expressed interest in the project but delegated the decision to Todd. Meanwhile, Twentieth Century Fox was in financial trouble following its severe box office losses of The Barbarian and the Geisha, A Certain Smile and The Roots of Heaven, all released in 1958. To reverse the studio's fortunes, studio president Spyros Skouras requested that studio executive David Brown find a viable project that would be a "big picture." Brown subsequently suggested a remake of Cleopatra (1917), which had starred Theda Bara.

In the fall of 1958, Wanger's production company entered into a coproduction agreement with Twentieth Century Fox. Wanger pitched four properties—Cleopatra, Justine, The Dud Avocado, and The Fall—for the executives to consider. They selected the first three, and Cleopatra would be the first to enter into production. On September 15, Wanger purchased the screen rights to Carlo Mario Franzero's biography The Life and Times of Cleopatra. On September 30, Skouras held his first meeting with Wanger, and asked his secretary to retrieve the screenplay for the 1917 version of Cleopatra. Skouras insisted, "All this needs is a little rewriting. Just give me this over again and we'll make a lot of money." Because the original screenplay had been written for a silent film, the script mostly contained instructions for camera setups.

In December 1958, Ludi Claire, a writer and former actress, was hired to write a rough draft of the script. That same month, art director John DeCuir was hired to produce conceptual artwork to illustrate the visual scale of the project. In March 1959, English author Nigel Balchin was hired to write another script draft. Meanwhile, Wanger had approached Alfred Hitchcock to direct the film, having worked with him on Foreign Correspondent (1940), but Hitchcock declined. Skouras then selected Rouben Mamoulian, who had worked with Wanger on Applause (1929), to direct. With Mamoulian as director, Balchin's script pleased neither him nor Taylor, who felt that the first act was forced and that Cleopatra lacked sufficient characterization. Based on his recently aired I, Don Quixote episode in the CBS anthology series DuPont Show of the Month, Dale Wasserman was selected to complete the final draft. Wanger instructed him to focus all attention on Cleopatra as the central role. Wasserman recounted that he had never met Taylor, so he watched her earlier films to better acquaint himself with her acting style. In the spring of 1960, English novelist Lawrence Durrell was hired to rewrite the script.

Casting
At a meeting, in October 1958, production head Buddy Adler favored a relatively cheap production of $2 million, with one of Fox's contract actresses, such as Joan Collins (who tested extensively for the part), Joanne Woodward or Suzy Parker, in the title role. Wanger protested, envisioning a much more opulent epic with a voluptuous actress as Cleopatra. Wanger suggested Susan Hayward while Audrey Hepburn, Sophia Loren, and Gina Lollobrigida were also under consideration. When Mamoulian was hired to direct, he had offered the title role to Dorothy Dandridge during a lunch meeting at the Romanoff's restaurant in Beverly Hills. Dandridge replied, "You won't have the guts to go through with this... They are going to talk you out of it."

In September 1959, Wanger contacted Taylor again on the set of Suddenly, Last Summer (1959), and Taylor asked for a record-setting contract of $1 million plus ten percent of the box-office gross. On October 15, a contract-signing event was staged inside Adler's office where Taylor signed blank papers because the real contract would not be ready for months. Wanger had considered Laurence Olivier and Rex Harrison for the role of Julius Caesar, and Richard Burton for Mark Antony. However, the studios refused to approve Harrison and Burton. On July 28, 1960, Taylor signed a real contract. It was also stipulated that the film would be shot in Europe and in the Todd-AO format, developed by Taylor's late husband Michael Todd, which ensured that Taylor would receive additional royalties.

In January 1960, Stephen Boyd was approached by Wanger about being cast as Mark Antony, but felt he was too young for the role. In August 1960, Boyd was cast as Mark Antony, Peter Finch as Julius Caesar and Keith Baxter as Octavian. Mamoulian had also cast Elisabeth Welch to portray one of Cleopatra's handmaidens.

Filming

Production under Rouben Mamoulian

With Mamoulian as director, construction on the Alexandria exteriors was already under way on the studio's backlot. London was also seen as a viable choice for hosting the production. The Eady Levy had offered financial incentives to American film studios as long as a certain percentage of the primary cast and production crew were English. There, the production would be supervised by Robert Goldstein, the studio's foreign head of production. A number of other countries, including Turkey and Egypt, were considered for exterior locations.

In 1960, Adler entered into a coproduction deal with Italian producer Lionello Santi, who had recently completed a foreign-language version of Cleopatra that the studio purchased to keep away from the American market. Mamoulian traveled to Italy for location scouting and reported back the difficulties upon shooting there. Furthermore, the impending Rome Summer Olympics threatened to complicate filming accommodations. On April 20, 1960, Santi issued a full-page ad in Variety announcing his forthcoming production of Cleopatra without mentioning Twentieth Century Fox's involvement. Angered, Adler shifted the entire production to Pinewood Studios. On July 11, Adler died from cancer, and was replaced by Goldstein. Skouras asked Wanger to assume Goldstein's former position, but months later, he was replaced by Sid Rogell. Meanwhile, Wanger cautioned about shooting in England in a July 15 memo, stating that the weather conditions could jeopardize Taylor's health and that the labor force was insufficient. However, Fox management overruled his decision.

Principal photography began at Pinewood Studios on September 28, 1960. On the same day, the British hairdressers' union threatened to leave production, as Taylor had brought Sydney Guilaroff, an American hairstylist. A settlement was reached that Guilaroff would be allowed to style Taylor's hair, but only at her Dorchester suite. Taylor shot a scene in 40-degree weather and fell sick with a sore throat, rendering her unable to work for two weeks. Mamoulian was then forced to proceed filming without Taylor, instead shooting scenes with Finch and Boyd. Taylor's cold soon progressed into a lingering fever, and for the next few weeks, she was treated by several doctors, including Lord Evans, Queen Elizabeth II's physician. On November 13, Taylor's fever reached 103 degrees and she was diagnosed with meningitis. By November 19, Wanger indefinitely postponed shooting, giving studio employees two weeks' notice until Taylor's health recovered. Taylor remained hospitalized for a week and then flew to Palm Springs, Florida with Eddie Fisher to recuperate. The Lloyd's of London insurance agency paid $2 million to cover Taylor's medical expenses.

During the pause in filming, Nunnally Johnson was hired to write a new script. Johnson wrote a 75-page draft for the first half of the film, mostly involving Cleopatra and Julius Caesar, that was similar in its tone to that of Cecil B. DeMille's Cleopatra (1934) and Caesar and Cleopatra (1945). Filming resumed on January 3, 1961, but Mamoulian was dissatisfied with Johnson's script. Taylor, who expressed similar displeasure, then appealed for Paddy Chayefsky to write a new script. Chayefsky demurred, saying that a rewrite would take six months. After sixteen weeks of filming and costs of $7 million, the crew had produced just ten minutes of film. Skouras blamed Mamoulian for the production having exceeded its budget. On January 18, 1961, Mamoulian resigned as director.

Mankiewicz takes over

To replace Mamoulian, Taylor announced that she would approve either George Stevens, who had directed her in A Place in the Sun, or Joseph L. Mankiewicz, who had directed her in Suddenly, Last Summer (1959). At the time, Mankiewicz was developing a film adaptation of the novel Justine, which was also a Wanger production. He initially declined the offer, but after meeting with Skouras and his agent Charles K. Feldman at the Colony Restaurant, he agreed to write and direct the project.

As an additional incentive, Skouras acquired Figaro, Inc., Mankiewicz's independent production company, for $3 million. In addition to his salary as writer and director, Mankiewicz received $1.5 million from the purchase, while his partner, NBC, received the other half. Having directed Julius Caesar (1953), Mankiewicz expressed his displeasure with the shooting script, stating it was "unreadable and unshootable." Mankiewicz also described Cleopatra's depiction as a "strange, frustrating mixture of an American soap-opera virgin and an hysterical Slavic vamp of the type Nazimova used to play." Because of this, he asked to rewrite the script from scratch, and the studio allowed him two months.

By February 1961, Mankiewicz had conceived a "modern, psychiatrically rooted concept of the film," envisioning Marc Antony's self-destruction because of his "inability to match [Julius] Caesar." Within one month, Lawrence Durrell and Sidney Buchman were recruited to collaborate with Mankiewicz on the new script. Story conferences were held with the three writers, and Durrell and Buchman then separately wrote "story-step" outlines. Mankiewicz would expand their outlines into a new script. Mankiewicz consulted the relevant sources, adapting historical literature written by Plutarch and Petronius. In late April, Mankiewicz had grown displeased with Durrell's work, while Buchman was instructed to complete an outline for the film. By then, Buchman's outline only covered the first quarter of the film. Mankiewicz had petitioned for playwrights Lillian Hellman or Paul Osborn to help finish the script, but Wanger hired screenwriter Ranald MacDougall.

Filming was set to resume on April 4, 1961. However, on March 4, Taylor was hospitalized again for pneumonia, and one news agency erroneously reported that she had died. She recovered after a tracheotomy was performed on her throat. On March 14, Twentieth Century Fox suspended production at Pinewood Studios. The sets were dismantled at the cost of $600,000. Skouras then decided to relocate the production to the studio's backlot in California. Meanwhile, Mankiewicz temporarily left his writing duties and scouted for suitable filming locations in Rome and Egypt. In June, Mankiewicz returned to the studio to report some Italian locations he had found, but was not eager to shoot in Egypt. On June 30, Skouras reversed his decision and agreed to allow Mankiewicz shoot the film at Cinecittà in Rome, where the sound stages had been occupied for the studio's television series and George Stevens's The Greatest Story Ever Told (1965).

Casting and personnel changes
During the interim, Finch and Boyd had left the production for other commitments, and each was paid his remaining salary. Laurence Olivier and Trevor Howard had turned down the role of Julius Caesar. Rex Harrison, who was the studio's fourth choice, was then cast. Mankiewicz then suggested Marlon Brando as Mark Antony, but Richard Burton landed the role after Taylor had seen him as King Arthur in the Broadway musical Camelot. Twentieth Century Fox paid Burton $250,000 plus $50,000 to buy out his contract. Roddy McDowall, who was also appearing in Camelot, was cast as Octavian. Mankiewicz had also insisted on casting John Valva, McDowall's close friend, creating an original character named Valvus. By mid-September 1961, Canadian actor Hume Cronyn, several American actors, including Martin Landau and Carroll O'Connor, and several English actors, such as Kenneth Haigh, Robert Stephens and Michael Hordern, were cast in supporting roles.

Jack Hildyard had resigned as cinematographer when Mamoulian agreed to step down as director. He was replaced by Leon Shamroy. In January 1962, Andrew Marton was brought in as second-unit director, replacing Ray Kellogg. Marton had previously worked on the first initial shoot. John DeCuir was still kept as production designer.

Shooting resumes in Rome
 
On September 25, 1961, principal photography began on the revamped production of Cleopatra. Mankiewicz had expressed his intention of directing a two-part epic: "I had in mind two separate but closely linked Elizabeth Taylor films—Caesar and Cleopatra and Antony and Cleopatra—each to run three hours, both segments to receive simultaneous release. Moreover, I felt compelled to undertake the writing of both halves myself, a measure of my total dissatisfaction with the material that had been produced to date."

At that time, he had completed 132 pages of the shooting script, with another 195 pages that remained to be written, so Mankiewicz shot the film in sequence, leaving several actors waiting indefinitely until their scenes were ready to be shot. For the first few months of filming, he filmed scenes during the daytime and wrote the script at night, resorting to amphetamine injections and wearing protective gloves because he contracted dermatitis in both hands. Overwhelmed, in February 1962, Mankiewicz rehired MacDougall to script several battle scenes (particularly those of Moongate and Actium) and the final 50 remaining pages of the second half.

On January 22, 1962, Taylor and Burton filmed their first scene together. Wanger observed in his journal: "There comes a time during the making of a movie when the actors become the characters they play... It was quiet, and you could almost feel the electricity between Liz and Burton." By February, news of the love affair made headlines worldwide; as both were married to others, the news brought bad publicity to the already troubled production.

By late May, most of the palace scenes were finished, but the remaining sequences, including those of the Battle of Pharsalus and Actium, the arrival of Cleopatra in Tarsus, and Antony's confrontation with Octavian's legions, were not yet filmed. Some of these sequences were to be shot in Egypt. Back in California, Fox had posted an annual loss for fiscal year 1961, with blame directed at the looming production costs of Cleopatra. As a result, Skouras assured shareholders that he was preparing to take "drastic measures" to reduce expenditures, which was followed by the cancellation of the Marilyn Monroe film Something's Got to Give.

From June 1–5, Fox executives Peter Levathes, Otto Koegel and Joseph Moskowitz, whom Wanger jokingly named as the "Three Wise Men," arrived on set to cancel the scheduled shoot of the Battle of Pharsalus. The committee informally fired Wanger by discontinuing his salary and expense account, demanded that Taylor's salary be terminated on June 9, and that all filming be halted by June 30. Mankiewicz refused to commit to the new terms, and sent a memo to then-studio chairman Samuel Rosenman requesting for Taylor's availability to be extended. In response, Rosenman permitted Taylor to work until June 23. On June 12, Wanger's "firing" was first reported by columnist Earl Wilson. Mankiewicz had read Wilson's column, and asked Lewis "Doc" Merman, the studio's production manager, to assume Wanger's position and thereby reinstate the filming of several sequences that were cut. Taylor and Burton, angered over Wanger's dismissal, had planned to protest unless Wanger was reinstated. Back in Los Angeles, Merman consulted with Levathes, in which they both agreed that Wanger would remain as producer.

In haste, the filming unit re-located to Ischia, off the coast of Italy where the battle of Actium was shot. The scene of Cleopatra's arrival aboard her barge in Tarsus was completed on June 23, which was Taylor's last day on set. On June 26, 1962, Skouras announced his resignation as studio president, effective on September 30. On July 25, Darryl F. Zanuck was elected as the new president of Fox, while Skouras became the new chairman of the board. Zanuck then fired Levathes, replacing him with his son Richard D. Zanuck. Principal photography ended on July 28, with the final location scenes in Egypt.

Post-production
In Los Angeles, Mankiewicz and his editor Dorothy Spencer prepared a rough cut that ran five hours and 20 minutes. On August 31, 1962, Zanuck wrote to Mankiewicz stating he wanted to see a completed first cut and a progress report no later than the first week of October. On October 13, Mankiewicz arranged a private screening of the film's four-and-a-half hour rough cut for Zanuck in Paris. According to Zanuck's account, he was shocked after having seen the first cut, and asked "to see the sequences that had been cut and decided some of them should be restored, but I found to my astonishment that no loops had been made for certain eliminated episodes." Another account states Zanuck felt the rough cut was "beautifully written, beautifully directed, and beautifully staged", but was dissatisfied with the battle sequences. They finished the screening on Sunday morning, October 14. After the screening was over, Zanuck rejected Mankiewicz's plea to distribute Cleopatra in two separate installments, believing audiences interested in the Taylor–Burton affair would not attend the first installment. He was further displeased with Cleopatra's dominance over Mark Antony, remarking: "If any woman behaved towards me like Cleopatra treated Antony, I would cut her balls off." 

Alternately, DeCuir, who was present after the screening, stated Zanuck asked for the film to be "cut to three hours and fifteen minutes." Zanuck cancelled the scheduled meeting for the next day, at which it was planned to discuss the film more in detail and departed from Paris. Meanwhile, Mankiewicz continued the dubbing sessions with Taylor and Burton. For several days, Zanuck ignored Mankiewicz's calls for another meeting, to which Mankiewicz later learned that Zanuck had hired editor and director Elmo Williams to supervise the completion and final editing of the film. Working to insert the deleted sequences, Williams had spent three consecutive 16-hour days, removing a total of 33 minutes from the original four-hour cut. Williams explained: "When he [Mankiewicz] first saw my version, he began ranting and raving and carrying on. He had finally given up the idea of releasing the picture as two separate films, but he hadn't counted on the released version being reduced in length." According to Zanuck, Mankiewicz had grown angry and demanded the sole responsibility of editing the film. Mankiewicz, however, denied there was any direct confrontation, stating their disagreements were exchanged through letters. 

On October 20, Mankiewicz sent a letter to Zanuck requesting an "honest and unequivocal statement of where I stand in relation to Cleopatra." A day later, Zanuck issued a nine-page response, blaming him for the film's excessive production costs. He further concluded: "On completion of the dubbing, your official services will be terminated ... If you are available and willing, I will call upon you to screen the re-edited version of the film." Mankiewicz's dismissal from the project was harshly criticized by Taylor and Burton. Taylor responded, "What has happened to Mr. Mankiewicz is disgraceful, degrading, particularly humiliating. I am terribly upset." Burton separately telephoned, "I think Mr. Mankiewicz might have made the first really good epic film. Now Cleopatra may be in trouble." On October 30, Mankiewicz flew back to his East Side townhouse where he held a press conference, insisting he had "never demanded control" nor disputed the studio's right to the final word on the finished cut. Instead, he stated he had "wanted to present the film to Fox and/or Zanuck as I saw it and be permitted to discuss with him my ideas for the picture."

On December 7, The New York Times reported that Mankiewicz would likely rejoin the production after having an "extremely constructive" conference with Zanuck. Both had agreed that new scenes with Harrison and Burton were needed for the film. Zanuck explained that he would "bend over backwards, artistically so that I wouldn't have to exercise [my rights as president] unless it became absolutely essential. Joe accepted that, took the scenes that I had blocked out crudely and roughly, went to work with them and wrote them." The new sequences included those meant to strengthen Antony's character so he would stand up to Cleopatra. With Mankiewicz reinstated as director, he partially restored several deleted sequences, including scenes of Sosigenes tutoring Cleopatra. In February 1963, several members of the cast, along with 1,500 extras, were called back to reshoot the Battle of Pharsalus in Almería, Spain. Mankiewicz then returned to London for eight consecutive days to reshoot new scenes with Burton at Pinewood Studios. The retakes primarily concerned Antony's scenes with his fourth wife Octavia and his companion, Rufio. On March 5, 1963, filming was finally completed.

Music

The music of Cleopatra was scored by Alex North. It was released several times, first as an original album, and later versions were extended. The most popular of these was the Deluxe Edition or 2001 Varèse Sarabande album.

Release
Cleopatra premiered at the Rivoli Theatre in New York City on June 12, 1963, with an estimated audience of 10,000 spectators congregated outside. Among those present at the premiere were Rex Harrison, Walter Wagner, Joseph L. Mankiewicz, Darryl F. Zanuck, Jacob Javits, Richard Rodgers, Joan Fontaine, Louis Nizer and Beatrice Miller. Burton and Taylor were not in attendance; Taylor was in London and Burton was filming Becket (1964). Top ticket prices at the Rivoli were a record $5.50. Soon after the film's premiere, its running time was truncated from 244 to 221 minutes. Two weeks after opening in New York, the film's release was expanded into 37 cities. For its general release in the United States, the film's running time was 184 minutes.

Home media
Cleopatra has been released on home video on several occasions. The film was released on videocassette by 20th Century-Fox Video in 1982. A three-disc DVD edition was released in 2001. The release included numerous supplemental features, including the two-hour documentary Cleopatra: The Film That Changed Hollywood.

Schawn Belston, senior vice president of library and technical services at Fox, led a two-year process that restored a four-hour, eight-minute version in 2013. The original 65-mm camera negative was located and used as a source. Fading and damage to the negative were corrected digitally but with care to preserve detail and authenticity. Belston's team also possessed the original magnetic print masters, from which they removed clicks and hisses and created a 5.1 surround sound track.

On May 21, 2013, the restored film was shown at a special screening at the 2013 Cannes Film Festival to commemorate the film's 50th anniversary. It was later released as a 50th-anniversary version available on DVD and Blu-ray. Since Fox had long ago destroyed all of the trims and outs from negatives to save costs, traditional outtakes could not be included. The home-media packages did include commentary tracks and two short films: The Cleopatra Papers and a 1963 film about the elaborate sets, The Fourth Star of Cleopatra.

Reception

Critical response
Bosley Crowther of The New York Times called Cleopatra "one of the great epic films of our day," crediting Mankiewicz for "his fabrication of characters of colorfulness and depth, who stand forth as thinking, throbbing people against a background of splendid spectacle, that gives vitality to this picture and is the key to its success." Vincent Canby, reviewing for Variety, wrote that Cleopatra is "not only a supercolossal eye-filler (the unprecedented budget shows in the physical opulence throughout), but it is also a remarkably literate cinematic recreation of an historic epoch." For the Los Angeles Times, Philip K. Scheuer felt Cleopatra was "a surpassingly beautiful film and a drama that need not hide its literate, intelligent face because it happens to have been written, not by Shakespeare or Shaw, but by three fellows named Joseph L. Mankiewicz, who also directed it, Ranald MacDougall and Sidney Buchman. These are, at any rate, the names on the screen credits, and they have done their job with integrity."

Time magazine harshly wrote: "As drama and as cinema, Cleopatra is riddled with flaws. It lacks style both in image and in action. Never for an instant does it whirl along on wings of epic elan; generally it just bumps from scene to ponderous scene on the square wheels of exposition." James Powers of The Hollywood Reporter wrote "Cleopatra is not a great movie. But it is primarily a vast, popular entertainment that sidesteps total greatness for broader appeal. This is not an adverse criticism, but a notation of achievement." Claudia Cassidy of the Chicago Tribune summarized Cleopatra as a "huge and disappointing film." Of the cast, she lauded "Rex Harrison's brilliantly quizzical Caesar, the best written role in Joseph Mankiewicz's erratic script, and haunted by Richard Burton's tragic Marc Antony, an actor's triumph over a writer's mediocrity. And with a prodigal gesture of futility, all of it is focused on Elizabeth Taylor, hopelessly out of her depth as a fishwife Cleopatra."

Penelope Houston, reviewing for Sight & Sound, acknowledged that Mankiewicz tried "to make this a film about people and their emotions rather than a series of sideshows. But for this ambition to hold up, over the film's great footage, he needed a visual style which would be more than merely illustrative, dialogue really worth speaking, and actors altogether more persuasive. As the sets seem to grow bigger and bigger, so progressively the actors dwindle." Judith Crist, in her review for the New York Herald Tribune, concurred: "So grand and grandiose are the sets that the characters are dwarfed, and so wide is his screen that this concentration on character results in a strangely static epic in which the overblown close-ups are interrupted at best by a pageant or dance, more often by unexciting bits and pieces of exits, entrances, marches or battles." Even Elizabeth Taylor found it wanting, saying, "They had cut out the heart, the essence, the motivations, the very core, and tacked on all those battle scenes. It should have been about three large people, but it lacked reality and passion. I found it vulgar."

The New York Times estimated that 80% of reviews in the United States were favorable but only 20% of reviews in Europe were positive. American film critic Emanuel Levy wrote retrospectively: "Much maligned for various reasons, [...] Cleopatra may be the most expensive movie ever made, but certainly not the worst, just a verbose, muddled affair that is not even entertaining as a star vehicle for Taylor and Burton." Billy Mowbray of British television channel Film4 remarked that the film is "[a] giant of a movie that is sometimes lumbering, but ever watchable thanks to its uninhibited ambition, size and glamour." Rotten Tomatoes aggregated 41 reviews and determined 56% of them to be positive. The website's consensus reads: "Cleopatra is a lush, ostentatious, endlessly eye-popping epic that sags [and] collapses from a (and how could it not?) four-hour runtime."

Box office
Three weeks into its theatrical release, Cleopatra became the number-one box office film in the United States, grossing $725,000 in 17 key cities. It held the top position for the next twelve weeks before being dethroned by The V.I.P.s, which also starred Elizabeth Taylor and Richard Burton. It recaptured the number-one spot three weeks later, and proved to be the highest-grossing film of 1963. By January 1964, the film had earned $15.7 million in distributor rentals from 55 theaters in the United States and Canada. It finished its box-office run with $26 million in rentals in the United States and Canada. The film was also a major hit in Italy, where it sold 10.9 million tickets. It sold a further 5.4 million tickets in France and Germany, and 32.9million tickets in the Soviet Union when it was released there in 1978.

By March 1966, Cleopatra had earned worldwide rentals of $38.04 million, leaving it $3 million short of breaking even. Fox eventually recouped its investment that same year when it sold the television broadcast rights to ABC for $5 million, a then-record amount paid for a single film. The film ultimately earned $40.3 million in worldwide rentals from its theatrical run.

Awards and nominations
The film won four Academy Awards and was nominated for five more. It also earned Elizabeth Taylor a Guinness World Record for the most costume changes in a film (65). This record was eclipsed in 1968 by Julie Andrews with 125 costume changes in the film Star!.

20th Century Fox mistakenly submitted Roddy McDowall to the Motion Picture Academy for consideration as Best Actor, rather than as Best Supporting Actor, for the Academy Awards. The Academy deemed his role ineligible for a leading actor category and told the studio it was too late to submit him in the correct category because the nomination ballots had already been sent to the printers. 20th Century Fox then published an open apology to McDowall in trade papers, stating, "We feel it is important that the industry realize that your electric performance as Octavian in Cleopatra, which was unanimously singled out by the critics as one of the best supporting performances by an actor this year, is not eligible for a nomination in that category... due to a regrettable error on the part of 20th Century Fox."

See also
 List of American films of 1963
 Roman Republic
 Ancient Egypt
 Ptolemaic dynasty
 Sword-and-sandal
 Lists of historical films
 List of films set in ancient Rome
 Asterix and Cleopatra

References

Bibliography

External links

 
 
 
 
 
 

1963 films
1960s biographical drama films
1960s historical romance films
1963 romantic drama films
20th Century Fox films
American biographical drama films
American epic films
American historical drama films
American historical romance films
American romantic drama films
Depictions of Augustus on film
Depictions of Cleopatra on film
Depictions of Julius Caesar on film
Depictions of Mark Antony on film
Cultural depictions of Germanicus
Drama films based on actual events
1960s English-language films
Films based on Antony and Cleopatra
Films based on multiple works
Films directed by Joseph L. Mankiewicz
Films produced by Walter Wanger
Films scored by Alex North
Films set in ancient Alexandria
Films set in ancient Egypt
Films set in ancient Rome
Films set in the 1st century BC
Films shot at Cinecittà Studios
Films shot at Pinewood Studios
Films shot in Almería
Films shot in Egypt
Films shot in Los Angeles County, California
Films shot in Naples
Films shot in Rome
Films that won the Best Costume Design Academy Award
Films that won the Best Visual Effects Academy Award
Films with screenplays by Sidney Buchman
Films with screenplays by Ranald MacDougall
Films with screenplays by Joseph L. Mankiewicz
Films whose art director won the Best Art Direction Academy Award
Films whose cinematographer won the Best Cinematography Academy Award
Final War of the Roman Republic films
Historical epic films
Liberators' civil war films
Romance films based on actual events
Romantic epic films
War romance films
1960s American films